HMS Boreas was a modified  sixth-rate frigate of the Royal Navy. She was first commissioned in August 1775 under Captain Charles Thompson. She was built at Blaydes Yard in Hull to a design by Sir Thomas Slade at a cost of £10,000. She was fitted out at Chatham Docks.

In 1778 she underwent a refit in Plymouth having a copper bottom fitted at a cost of £5500.

In July 1779 she saw action in the Battle of Grenada under command of Captain Thompson.

On 31 August 1779 Boreas, still under Captain Thompson, captured the French corvette Compas, of eighteen 6-pounder guns, which was carrying a cargo of sugar. Compas, which was armed en flute, put up resistance for about 20 minutes, with the result that she suffered nine men killed and wounded before she struck. Boreas was part of a squadron under the command of Rear Admiral of the Red Hyde Parker on the Jamaica station.

Horatio Nelson was Senior Naval Officer of the Leeward Islands from 1784 to 1787 in Boreas.

Boreas was used as a slop ship from 1797 until her sale in 1802.

Footnotes
Notes

Citations

References
 *Clowes, W. Laird, et al. (1897-1903) The royal navy: a history from the earliest times to the present. (Boston: Little, Brown and Co.; London: S. Low, Marston and Co.).
 Demerliac, Alain (1996) La Marine De Louis XVI: Nomenclature Des Navires Français De 1774 À 1792. (Nice: Éditions OMEGA). 
 Robert Gardiner, The First Frigates, Conway Maritime Press, London 1992. .
 David Lyon, The Sailing Navy List, Conway Maritime Press, London 1993. .

1774 ships
Sixth-rate frigates of the Royal Navy
Ships built on the Humber